The Prisoner of Sex is a book by Norman Mailer, originally published in 1971 in Harper's Magazine. He wrote the book in reaction to developments in women's liberation and technology. Written in the third person, it defends his writing against feminist writer Kate Millett.

Summary 

The Prisoner of Sex was first published in 1971 in Harper's Magazine and was subsequently published as a book. The piece is Mailer's response to the 1960s Women's Liberation movement, though he spends much of the book attacking one literary critic, Kate Millett. Mailer has many issues with both the Women's Liberation Movement and Millett, who casts Mailer and authors Henry Miller and D. H. Lawrence as symbols of misogyny. Mailer's core point is that though women may try to equal men, this is unattainable and undesirable due to biological differences between the sexes. Hence, the title: we are all prisoners of sex, despite our greatest attempts to escape.
 
Mailer structures his work into four sections and refers to himself in the third person as "the Prize Winner" or "the Prisoner of Sex." Each section casts the author in a different role to explain an aspect of his views on Women's Liberation.

The Prize Winner

The first section begins with Mailer describing his travails in caring for his children by himself for six weeks. It is Mailer's attempt at understanding being a woman, about which he writes, "He could not know whether he would have found it endurable to be born a woman or if it would have driven him out onto the drear avenues of the insane." The remainder of this section consists of Mailer writing about the growing Women's Liberation movement and the backlash against his work he received from these "enraged Amazons, an honor guard of revolutionary vaginas," and concluding that he needed to further articulate his thoughts about women.

The Acolyte

In this second section, Mailer, understood to be an acolyte in the title, begins by surveying the writings and participants of the Women's Liberation movement. He considers women as a class in economic terms. Though unwilling to admit many of their grievances, he acknowledges the problem of unequal pay: "Even men opposed to Women's Liberation were willing to agree that the economic exploitation of the female was a condition in need of amendment." In this section he also falls into the stereotypical male tropes of female neurosis, blaming a woman's period for car crashes, increased admission to mental hospitals, and crime. This is part of a larger argument about the inherent physical strength of women compared to men. The womb and the ability to conceive incarcerates women. According to Mailer, "The defeat (of women) was built in." It is also in this section that Mailer goes into a long discussion on the philosophical and existential purpose of the female orgasm and what it means for men and man-kind when women figure out how to orgasm without the assistance of a penis. The clitoral orgasm where no man or phallus is needed, as opposed to a vaginal orgasm, is an aspect of the Women's Liberation movement that shows Mailer's inner fear of not being "needed".

The Advocate
 
This section consists almost entirely of Mailer attacking the work of Kate Millett. He opens the section by proclaiming that "by any major literary perspective, the land of Millett is a barren and mediocre terrain." He attacks Millett for what he perceives to be an unfair assessment of his work and two of his favorite literacy figures, Miller and Lawrence. He critiques her use of quotes and the conclusions that she comes to through her picking of quotes. He believes that it does not give the authors any credit for the work they did to understand women, taking issue with her only drawing attention to their oppression of women. He then continues his discussion of sex by debating the power dynamics of male prison sex, equating power and dominance to manliness and submission, and penetration to the societal example of a woman. The instinctual power dynamic is representative of male-female relations. He writes that in prison, "One's ass becomes one's woman; one's honor is that she is virginal." Mailer makes the case that succumbing to the natural depth of womanhood and manhood is a necessity. He writes that it may be necessary for "humans with vaginas, not necessarily devoted from the beginning to maternity, must deepen into a condition which was not female automatically, must take a creative leap into becoming women." Essentially arguing that womanhood is based on the confines of the womb. His discussion eventually turns into the evolution of sex as a transaction. In prison, sex is a transaction, a transaction of power. Mailer writes that heterosexual sex became transactional and more like homosexual sex with the invention of the pill, as there is no chance of conception. Only power, cruelty, lust, desire, or pleasure is traded. Mailer states that "the development of Women's Liberation may have paralleled to the promulgation of the pill."

The Prisoner
 
Mailer in this section spends time discussing the genetics of sex. He discusses how sex is determined beyond basic chromosomal knowledge and theorizes how the determination of sex may, through the selective fertilization of an egg, be a larger meaning than just chance. Mailer discusses how even the choice of a woman to have sex with a particular man has an impact on the outcome of a child, putting great meaning onto the act of sex. His sentiments about sex are summed up in this statement: "No thought was more painful as the idea that sex had meaning: for give meaning to sex and one was the prisoner of sex.". Mailer concludes the book by coming full circle to his own life. He describes an example of a couple where responsibilities are shared and are given equal importance. Mailer states that if he were to have this kind of roommate, he would rather have a man. His work should not suffer to help unless her work were more important than his—and that just isn't possible according to himself. Mailer makes a final call for succumbing to the differences between sexes that are rooted in biological differences. A perfect world for Mailer would be one in which "people would found their politics on the fundamental demands they make of sex," one in which Women's Liberation supporters would accept that liberation from sex simply is not possible.

Reviews and critiques

Brigid Brophy for The New York Times
On May 23, 1971, The New York Times published Brigid Brophy's review of The Prisoner of Sex. Her piece was titled, "Meditations on Norman Mailer, by Norman Mailer, Against the Day a Norman Mailest Comes Along." Brophy was a well-respected English novelist and critic. She was a feminist and a campaigner for social reforms. She was uniquely suited to critique not only Mailer but Kate Millett as well, who Mailer attempted to attack within his work. 
 
Brophy does not believe Mailer has accomplished a fair critique of Millett's "Sexual Politics." In fact, Brophy believes Mailer could have dissected Millett's work better to reveal its bias. However, Mailer is not the man for the job, as she points out. She believes a better author, perhaps Gore Vidal, could have provided a more critical analysis and response to Millett's fallacies. Perhaps one would think Brophy would outright support Millett since they both identify as feminists. However, Brophy feels it is necessary to point out the flaws in both men's and women's work, therefore, she provides feedback on her misgivings about Millett's novel. Brophy critiques Millett's writing within her article, calling out the novelist's "blindness."
 
Brophy does not let Mailer off the hook, however, she points out that "Mr. Mailer is not, however, a champion of other men's rights, any more than he is of women's." She addresses Mailer's choice to write his piece in third-person narrative, asserting that, "Mr. Mailer writes in the third person, presumably because the pronoun 'I' wouldn't remind the reader often enough that Mr. Mailer is a he." Brophy, on the whole, is unimpressed with Mailer's literary ability, analysis, and wit. 
 
Brophy is past the two sexes butting heads to outwit or argue with one another. Instead, she wants people (men and women) to see the ways consumerism culture has defined the sexes and has created the binary which both sexes suffer from.  Her analysis is striking as she asks her readers to move past both Millett and Mailer. She writes, "We need a vast movement of Human Lib and we're offered a diversionary, though not diverting, sideshow. Millettancy versus the Mailer Reaction is a rigged fight. It's a revival of the traditional slapstick of sex hostility, a routine that became obsolete when it became unnecessary for anyone to be left holding an unwanted baby. Perhaps the object is to embroil men and women in fictitious and irrational sex warfare, so that we will go obediently on buying our His and Hers consumer goods (including His and Hers consumer books) and never notice that the system is dehumanizing us all."

Annette Barnes for The Massachusetts Review
In the 1972 Winter Issue of The Massachusetts Review, Annette Barnes critiques The Prisoner of Sex for six pages. In her article, "Norman Mailer: A Prisoner of Sex," she does not outright condemn Mailer's position in his novel. Instead, Barnes is reflective of why Mailer has his opinions of sex and the sexes. She questions what it means when Mailer calls himself a "prisoner of sex." She finds Mailer has not proven his argument by the end of his novel, instead she claims, "Mailer gives us a vision, not an argument." She acknowledges that Mailer has written himself as the hero of his novel. However, Barnes highlights that "the journey of the hero, although often enlightening, is also a journey of self-justification and even self-deception." 
 
Barnes provides a poignant summarization of the themes of Mailer's novel. She tackles Mailer's interesting perspective of creation and technology, writing, "Mailer fantasizes much over lost seeds, over lost creations. Creation is a key. Women are needed in the process of creating new life and any technology which makes either man or woman non-crucial is Evil." Barnes beautifully critiques Mailer's opinion of creation for its sexism because, "Having babies is no simple event. Once the creature descends from the womb, he or she needs care. Who gets the job? What Mailer never comes to terms with is the price he requires of women for their participation in creation." Barnes does not understand why Mailer or anyone should believe Mailer's opinion over that of a woman who actually has knowledge and ownership of a womb, which Mailer speaks so reverently of. 
 
Perhaps Mailer's greatest perspective in The Prisoner of Sex is his opinion of technology and its future. Barnes takes note of this but instills her own opinion of Mailer and his sexism. "Mailer fears technology. It depersonalizes. He fears its imprint on contraception, planned parenthood, and eugenics. But he writes as if in light of the general depersonalization of man by the machine, the depersonalization of women by man is a lesser evil. At least a man is thrusting into you, not just a plastic prick."
 
She finds at the end of her critique that both men and women are prisoners of sex if defined by Mailer's terms.

Town Bloody Hall

Mailer took his critics head on in a panel in 1971 in New York City's Town Hall. Mailer participated in a Town Hall with feminist critics and writers to defend his position in his book The Prisoner of Sex. The panel participants were all feminists and included Jacqueline Ceballos, Germaine Greer, Jill Johnston, and Diana Trilling. Each had read Mailer's The Prisoner of Sex. Many members of the audience were notable figures, like Betty Friedan, who had also read Mailer's new work. Seated in the audience, Cynthia Ozick remarks that she finished his book on her train ride to the town hall. To start the evening, each of the women had ten minutes to speak at the podium before participating in a panel with Mailer. Mailer was the self-appointed emcee for the evening and took his position seriously, finding many occasions to cut off the women and chastise the audience. Mailer takes a defensive position throughout the entire night. However, the evening gets quickly out of hand with heckling from the audience and volatile responses from Mailer. The Town Hall was documented in a film documentary in 1979, Town Bloody Hall.

Themes in The Prisoner of Sex

Much of this text deals with issues that Mailer contends upon considering sex. Like many of Mailer's other texts, his strong opinions about how sex should be are reinforced constantly throughout. Sex is viewed in a complex, layered manner. When it comes to analyzing women and the womb, Mailer views them as intrinsically connected. Women are given the gift (and burden) of having the power to create life. Still, to use this power, they need male assistance; they cannot fulfill their duties without the presence of a man. He argues that women are obsessed with men and put on makeup to maintain their attraction, but Mailer himself feels threatened by their physical appearances, as he admits in this text. Additionally, he argues that men and women are near-equals that are stuck in a constant fight for domination, which often manifests itself in sexual acts, framing it as a battle for control. Mailer focuses on the male experience with sex, especially within the Women's Liberation movement, to defend his past statements and current views of women. This leads to his concern with the development of technology. There is an overarching sense of fear that the development of technology will make people obsolete and erase individuality. With the development of technology related to contraception, he is concerned that men would become less necessary for sex, giving women a monopoly over the power of creation – a power he fears they will be naïve and abuse, eventually forcing men to take over the typically "wifely" duties around the house. He is concerned that the development of technology will upset the necessary social balance between men and women, leading to disastrous results. He argues that women's increasing influence on men is bringing about all the problems in modern society, which primarily manifests in this conflict with technology.

Even though he claims that he supports Women's Liberation, his writings, public statements, and actions are often seen as sexist. Many feminist leaders, especially Kate Millett, criticized his work, and he took this criticism harder than usual because he was at the height of his fame at the time. Additionally, Mailer was frequently confused as to why the Women's Liberation Movement was largely against him. While Mailer typically enjoyed debating others who were strongly against him, Millett's criticism unusually got under his skin, as he admits that he is more upset when criticized by a woman than if by a man. However, he does praise women for passionately arguing with him.

Mailer's views of women in this piece go back and forth throughout, making it unclear overall what his final stance is; he goes from stating that "his respect for the power of women was so large that…[it] would tear through him" to arguing that women should be kept in cages. He constantly stands by his statement that he does not hate women – even though some other parts of this piece seem to contradict this. He states that his past writings do not reflect his actual beliefs, however, his personal statements often contradict this.

Footnotes

Sources 
 Annette Barnes, The Massachusetts Review, (1972), 
 Brigid Brophy, The New York Times, (1971), https://www.nytimes.com/1971/05/23/archives/the-prisoner-of-sex-240-pp-boston-little-brown-co-595-prisoner-of.html
 
 Town Bloody Hall, A Film by Chris Hegedus and D A Pennebaker, 1979, https://phfilms.com/films/town-bloody-hall/#credits

1971 essays
Essays by Norman Mailer
Social history of the United States
Works originally published in American magazines